India Inc. is a common term used by the Indian media to refer to the formal (comprising government and corporate) sector of the nation. It employed 7 percent of the workforce in 2000 and contributed 60 per cent of the nominal GDP of the nation. The informal sector consists of 44 million non-farm enterprises as per recent labour survey.
The Companies Act 2013 allows a variety of formations in the mixed economy of India. The Ministry of Company Affairs estimates that as of 31 October 2005, there were

There were 17,49,359 companies as on 31.03.2018. Out of those 3,47,857 were headquartered in Maharashtra, 3,17,998 were headquartered in Delhi, 1,96,724 were headquartered in West Bengal, 1,34,615 were headquartered in Tamil Nadu and 1,04,847 were headquartered in Karnataka. The number of active companies out of those total 17,49,359 companies were 11,67,858

According to  Annual report as on 31.03.2018, a total of 11,67,858 active companies were on the Register (consisting of 10,88,657 private limited companies and 71,288 public limited companies). Out of the above, large number of companies were engaged in Business Services(3.56 Lakh) followed by Manufacturing (2.33 Lakh), Trading (1.52 Lakh) and Construction Trading (1.05 Lakh) sectors.

See also
 Corporate America
 UK plc
 Brand India
 Make in India
 My Gov (India)
 Digital India

References

External links
 India Inc. and its moral discontents
 India Inc. The official RuneScape clan for India recognised by Jagex Ltd.
 India Inc.: Aiming Higher by Susan Kitchens (forbes.com)
 India Inc., Still Going Strong by Jaikumar Vijayan (computerworld.com)
 India Inc. arrives overseas by Vipul Mudgal for HT Research (HindustanTimes.com)

Economy of India
Economic history of India (1947–present)